The sharp-nose garden eel (Gorgasia taiwanensis) is an eel in the family Congridae (conger/garden eels). It was described by Shao Kwang-Tsao in 1990. It is a marine, subtropical eel which is known from Taiwan (from which its species epithet is derived) and southern Japan, in the northwestern Pacific Ocean. It can be identified by the shape of its snout.

References

Gorgasia
Taxa named by Shao Kwang-Tsao
Fish described in 1990